Gómez Ortega is a surname. Notable people with the surname include:

Casimiro Gómez Ortega (1741–1818), Spanish physician and botanist
José Gómez Ortega (1895–1920), Spanish bullfighter
Rafael Gómez Ortega (1882–1960), Spanish bullfighter, brother of José